Langbach (also: Röhlesbach or Roderbach) is a small river of North Rhine-Westphalia and Rhineland-Palatinate, Germany. It is a right tributary of the Kyll near Frauenkron.

See also
List of rivers of Rhineland-Palatinate

References 

Rivers of the Eifel
Rivers of Rhineland-Palatinate
Rivers of Germany